André Chalmel (born October 10, 1949) is a French former road racing cyclist, born in Saint-Malo (Ille-et-Vilaine, Brittany). He was, during a few years, one of  Bernard Hinault's team-mates on the Renault–Elf–Gitane professional cycling team. He is a former winner of Bordeaux–Paris (in 1979). He was also a medalist in the French professional national road championships.

He was previously president of the National Union of Professional Cyclists (l'Union Nationale des Cyclistes Professionels) in 1980. He currently serves on the committee of the Bretagne cycling federation and is an honorary member of VC St Malo.

References
 

French male cyclists
1949 births
Living people
Sportspeople from Saint-Malo
Cyclists from Brittany